The Kleptomaniac, is a 1905 American silent drama film, directed by Edwin S. Porter partly filmed on location in New-York denouncing the discriminatory treatment of the poor by the justice system. It is one of the first American social drama and Courtroom drama.

Plot
The film contrasts the story of two women: The first, a well-dressed lady, leaves her elegant building and is taken in her carriage to a department store. While she is in the store, she steals several items, and is caught by store detectives. The second, a poor woman with two small children, steals a loaf of bread out of desperation, and is quickly caught and arrested. Both women are taken to the police station and then into court, where a judge expeditiously deals with various defendants. The rich lady is quickly released with the help of her lawyer and embraces her husband while the poor woman is condemned despite the supplications of her little daughter.

Analysis
The film is composed of 11 shots, each introduced by an intertitle (in italics below)(*note: not all prints of this film have the intertitles):

1. Leaving home. Diagonal view of a street. A lady dressed in black comes out of a luxury building. [pan right] and boards a hackney coach which departs.

2. Arriving at store. Diagonal view of a street with the door of Macy's department store. The hackney coach stops in front of the door. The lady in black alights the camera pans left to follow her as she enters the department store.

3. Interior of department store. Counters with customers and sales women and a male overseer. The lady in black is shown several items and when the saleswoman is not watching, puts something in her muff. She does it a second time but she is seen by a detective who asks her to follow him.

4. Superintendent's office. An office with a man standing with his secretary. The lady in black is brought in by the detective and the stolen objects are taken out of her muff.

5. Leaving store. Same street as 2. The lady in black comes out of the door, accompanied by the detective. The camera pans right as they board a hackney coach.

6. Home of thief. A room with a poor woman sitting prostrated at a table and a child sitting on the floor. A young girl enters and kisses her mother who puts on a scarf on her head, kisses the child and leaves. 

7. Stealing bread.  Diagonal view of the corner of a street with a shop. An apprentice is called by his boss and leaves a basket of bread in front of the shop. The poor woman takes a piece of bread from the basket and tries to leave but is caught by the shopkeeper who calls a policeman. The latter takes the woman away.

8. Arriving at the police station. A street covered in snow with a large building. The hackney coach seen in 5 arrives and stops before the camera which pans to the right to follow the lady in black  accompanied into the police station.

9. Arriving at police station in patrol wagon. Same view as shot 8. A patrol car arrives and stops before the building. The camera pans right to follow the poor woman who is taken inside by the policeman.

10. Court room scene. Several defendants are brought in and the judge expeditiously delivers his judgments. The poor woman is brought in and tries to defend her case while the shopkeeper accuses her. The young girl kneels down to implore the judge. Her mother takes her in her arms but she is torn away from her. The lady in black faces the accusation of the saleswoman and starts crying while her lawyer defends her. The judge rejects the accusation and the lady embraces her husband.

11. Tableaux. Justice as a half blindfolded woman holding a pair of scales where a bag of gold weighs more than a piece of bread.

All shots are wide or full shots which make it sometimes difficult for viewers to follow the action, notably in shot 3. The outdoor shots were filmed in New-York and show snow covered street filmed diagonally with a great depth of field and with camera panning to follow the characters.

Charles Musser considers that this is Porter's most radical film because of the way it condemns the class bias of government and justice. The fact that the rich lady is mentioned in Edison's catalog as Mrs. Banker would imply that in the same way as she steals in the department store, her husband the banker steals his clients. Porter implies that a socioeconomic system in which two essential values, familial responsibility and honesty, are in conflict needs to be reevaluated.

Matthias Kuzina regards the film as a precursor of contemporary social problem films, concerning "the nature of class conflict in America and the subjugation of the interests of the poor in general and the impotence of the individual in particular".

For Kay Sloan, the film offers "a scathing portrait of the American legal system and its treatment of the poor. (...) Court scenes (...) resembled a virtual assembly line of justice - as marshals herded the accused before the judge like so many cattle. Yet the wealthy were brushed out of the courtroom with a sympathetic wave of the hand." She considers that the film suggests that the nation's criminaloids (a term used by sociologist Edward A. Ross in 1907 to designate those taking advantage of their positions of power) "stretched even to those in judicial robes". She notes however that the film was not regarded as provocative, because the message implied that the powerless "would remain passive victims of greed and injustice".

The structure of the film with the cross-cutting between two parallel stories and the allegorical ending has been highlighted by Miriam Hansen as an early example of the way in which in the tradition of silent films, allegorical tendencies are combined with primitive narrative styles, often in conjunction with parallelism. Hansen stresses the innovative use of allegory by Porter in this film by comparing it with D. W. Griffith's Intolerance. While the cradle image in Intolerance embraces the allegorical tradition in its most conservative intentions, Porter on the contrary alienates the familiar representation of Justice as a blindfolded woman holding a horizontal pair of scales by showing the blindfold discovering one eye and the scales tipped.

The film has also been noted as one of the first representing a department store, albeit in a rather negative way.

References

External links
 
 The Kleptomaniac (1905) at A Cinema History

1905 films
Surviving American silent films
American black-and-white films
1905 drama films
American drama films
1905 short films
American legal drama films
Films about discrimination
Films directed by Edwin S. Porter
1900s American films